Bukit Merah Secondary School (BMSS) is a co-educational government secondary school in Bukit Merah, Singapore. BMSS has established itself as a Value-Added school since 1993, offering the Express, Normal Academic and Normal Technical streams leading to a Singapore-Cambridge GCE Ordinary Level or Singapore-Cambridge GCE Normal Level certificate.

History
BMSS was the 101st school built by the government. It was completed and handed over to the Ministry of Education on 28 December 1967. The school received its first batch of students on 4 January 1968 and was officially declared open by Lim Guan Hoo, the Member of Parliament for Bukit Merah, on 16 May 1968.

In 2001, St. Thomas Secondary School merged with BMSS and the old school building was demolished to make way for a new campus with better facilities that would cater to the growing school population. In 2004, Delta Secondary School merged with BMSS. In the same year, the new school building at Lengkok Bahru was officially declared open by Chay Wai Chuen, Member of Parliament for Tanjong Pagar GRC. The following year, a new vision and mission statement was crafted for the school to better reflect its identity following the mergers.

In 2017, Henderson Secondary School merged into BMSS to give BMSS strategic depth and to allow for a wider range of educational and enrichment programmes for students. The school continues to be known as Bukit Merah Secondary School in English, while adopting the former Henderson Secondary School's Chinese name Da Shan Zhong Xue (达善中学) in order to reflect the amalgamation of the strengths and heritage of both schools.

Identity and culture

School crest
The school crest, a red triangle resembling a hill, represents Bukit Merah, which means "red hill" in Malay. The insignia in the crest stands for "BM" (Bukit Merah) and resembles the cursive style of Chinese calligraphy for the Chinese characters hongshan (红山), which is the Chinese name of Bukit Merah. The flash leads upwards to signify progress, steadfastness, sureness and the inculcation of values. In the flash is the school motto "Sedia", which means "ready/prepared" in Malay.

Academic information 
Being a government secondary school, BMSS offers three academic streams, namely the four-year Express course, as well as the Normal Course, comprising Normal (Academic) and Normal (Technical) academic tracks.

GCE O Level Express Course 
The Express Course is a nationwide four-year programme that leads up to the Singapore-Cambridge GCE Ordinary Level examinations.

Academic subjects 
The examinable academic subjects for Singapore-Cambridge GCE Ordinary Level offered by BMSS for upper secondary level (via. streaming in Secondary 2 level), as of 2017, are listed below.

Notes:
 Subjects indicated with ' * ' are mandatory subjects.
 All students in Singapore are required to undertake a Mother Tongue Language as an examinable subject, as indicated by ' ^ '.
 "SPA" in Pure Science subjects refers to the incorporation of School-based Science Practical Assessment, which 20% of the subject result in the national examination are determined by school-based practical examinations, supervised by the Singapore Examinations and Assessment Board. The SPA Assessment has been replaced by one Practical Assessment in the 2018 O Levels.

Normal Course 
The Normal Course is a nationwide 4-year programme leading to the Singapore-Cambridge GCE Normal Level examination, which runs either the Normal (Academic) curriculum or Normal (Technical) curriculum, abbreviated as N(A) and N(T) respectively.

Normal (Academic) Course 
In the Normal (Academic) course, students offer 5-8 subjects in the Singapore-Cambridge GCE Normal Level examination. Compulsory subjects include:
 English Language
 Mother Tongue Language
 Mathematics
 Combined Humanities
A 5th year leading to the Singapore-Cambridge GCE Ordinary Level examination is available to N(A) students who perform well in their Singapore-Cambridge GCE Normal Level examination. Students can move from one course to another based on their performance and the assessment of the school principal and teachers.

Normal (Technical) Course 
The Normal (Technical) course prepares students for a technical-vocational education at the Institute of Technical Education. Students will offer 5-7 subjects in the Singapore-Cambridge GCE Normal Level examination. The curriculum is tailored towards strengthening students’ proficiency in English and Mathematics. Students take English Language, Mathematics, Basic Mother Tongue and Computer Applications as compulsory subjects.

Notable alumni
 Jeremy Chan, Mediacorp television presenter and actor
 Nick Shen, Mediacorp actor
 Pritam Singh, member of parliament for Aljunied GRC

References

External links 
 Bukit Merah Secondary School website

Secondary schools in Singapore
Bukit Merah
Educational institutions established in 1968
Schools in Central Region, Singapore